Pearl Harbor and the Explosions was a musical act from San Francisco, California, United States. Forming in 1979, the new wave band had limited success in the late 1970s and early 1980s, with their debut single, "Drivin'", reaching the lower end of the American Billboard chart in 1980. In the same year, they released a self-titled LP which included the song "Shut Up and Dance", which received considerable airplay, particularly in the Bay Area.

The vocalist, Pearl E. Gates (also known as Pearl Harbor and later Pearl Harbour (British and Canadian spelling), was based in the UK and was married to Clash bassist Paul Simonon. Gates had been a part of the Leila and the Snakes live shows, then formed the band. After Gates left the band, the remaining members, Peter  and the Stench brothers (stage names for John and Hilary Hanes) performed as Peter  and the Expressions.

Discography 
 Pearl Harbor and the Explosions (1979/1980)

References

External links
Pearl Harbor and the Explosions bio (at mp3.com)
Pearl Harbor and the Explosions bio (at artistdirect.com)

Pearl Harbor & the Explosions Myspace
2013 interview with Ms. Pearl Harbour (Patterns and Tones blogspot)

American new wave musical groups
Musical groups from San Francisco